Southbank Sinfonia is a British chamber orchestra founded in 2002. Composed of young professionals from around the world, each year it brings together 33 graduate musicians for a programme of performance and professional development.

The annual fellowship comprises performances across Britain and Europe, and features orchestral repertoire, chamber music, opera, dance and theatre, alongside artist development sessions.

An integral part of the programme is the orchestra's creative partnerships with performing arts organisations including the Royal Opera House, Academy of St Martin in the Fields, the National Theatre and artists such as Patron Vladimir Ashkenazy.

Southbank Sinfonia is based at St John's, Smith Square, where a regular series of free 'Rush Hour' concerts are held throughout the year.

The orchestra frequently collaborates with artists from other music genres, including Squarepusher in 2013, as well as in theatrical projects with the National Theatre. These have included critically acclaimed productions of Amadeus in 2016/18, and Every Good Boy Deserves Favour in 2009/10.

The orchestra was shortlisted for a Royal Philharmonic Society Award for Ensemble in 2016 and a Royal Philharmonic Society Award for Concert Series and Festivals in 2017 for #ConcertLab, a series that explores new approaches to concert presentation.

Southbank Sinfonia is the resident orchestra of the Anghiari Festival, held in the town of Anghiari (Tuscany, Italy) each July.

Southbank Sinfonia's patrons include Sir Thomas Allen, John Anderson, Vladimir Ashkenazy, Edward Gardner, Patricia Hodge, James Naughtie and the Rt Hon Lord Smith of Finsbury.

History

Southbank Sinfonia was founded in 2002 by Simon Over, its Music Director. The aim of Southbank Sinfonia is to provide an ensemble that would bridge the one-year period after graduation, giving them a springboard into the music profession.

References

London orchestras
Chamber orchestras